Anne Cawrse ( "coarse"; born 23 January 1981) is an Australian composer based in South Australia. She is currently on the composition staff at Elder Conservatorium of Music.

After growing up in Freeling, South Australia, she moved to Adelaide to study composition at the Elder Conservatorium of Music where she completed her PhD in 2008.

Starting in 2021, Cawrse became the curator of the Adelaide Symphony Orchestra festival "She Speaks", a classical music festival with a focus on music written by female composers.

In 2022, she was one of the recipients of the Prelude Composer Residencies, awarded by the Peggy Glanville-Hicks Trust. The same year, Cawrse's album Advice to a Girl was released on ABC Classics. It features works for strings, voice and guitar, performed by Sharon and Slava Grigoryan (cello, guitar), Bethany Hill (soprano), Aleksandr Tsiboulski (guitar) and the Australian String Quartet.

Awards 
Cawrse's work A Room of Her Own (2020) for string quartet won the 2021 Albert H. Maggs Composition Award and the 2021 APRA Art Music Award in the Work of the Year: Chamber category. A Room of Her Own was commissioned, premiered and released by the Australian String Quartet.

Her work On Earth as in Heaven, using texts by Michael Leunig and Sara Teasdale, was a finalist in the 2018 APRA Art Music Awards in the Vocal/Choral Work of the Year category.

References

External links 
 
 

1981 births
University of Adelaide alumni
Academic staff of the University of Adelaide
APRA Award winners
Australian women classical composers
Living people